B91 may refer to :
 Bundesstraße 91, a German road
 Loiblpass Straße, an Austrian road
 Sicilian Defence, Najdorf Variation, according to the list of chess openings
 Law, according to the Uniclass (Unified Classification for the Construction Industry) codes